Ingrid Baltzersen (born 16 October 1980) is a Norwegian politician.

She chaired the Workers' Communist Party from 2006 to 2007. She was thus the last chairman of this party, and became vice chairman of the new Red Party.

She was elected to Oslo city council for the period 2007–2011. Outside politics, she has been working as a tram driver.

References

1980 births
Living people
Politicians from Oslo
Red Party (Norway) politicians
Norwegian women in politics
21st-century Norwegian politicians